Sehhatabad Rural District is in the Central District of Eshtehard County, Alborz province, Iran. At the most recent census of 2016, it had a population of 3,403 in 1,035 households. The largest of its 42 villages was Eshtehard Industrial Town (شهرک صنعتي اشتهارد), with 1,217 people. The village of Sehhatabad had 993 inhabitants.

References 

Eshtehard County

Rural Districts of Alborz Province

Populated places in Alborz Province

Populated places in Eshtehard County